Idrettslaget Varden Meråker is a multi-sports club from Meråker, Norway.

Established in 1910, it has sections for skiing, football and handball.

Well-known club members include cross-country skiers Magnar Lundemo, Tor Arne Hetland, and Marthe Kristoffersen.

References
Official site 

Sports teams in Norway
Football clubs in Norway
Sports clubs established in 1910
Sport in Trøndelag
Meråker
1910 establishments in Norway